Anthony Norris (born June 6, 1963) is an American retired professional wrestler and football player. He is best known for his appearances with the professional wrestling promotion World Wrestling Federation (WWF) from 1995 to 1998, under the ring name Ahmed Johnson. He was one of the most prominent stars in the WWF in the early Attitude Era. In the WWF, he held the WWF Intercontinental Championship, making him the first African American to win a singles championship in the WWF. He also headlined the In Your House 9: International Incident pay-per-view event.

Norris was born in Indiana, on June 6, 1963, growing up Auburn, Florida and Pearl River, Mississippi before moving to Texas. While attending high school, he performed well at American football, basketball, amateur wrestling, and track and field.

Professional wrestling career

Early career (1989–1995)
Norris trained as a professional wrestler under Skandor Akbar, Scott Casey and Ivan Putski. After making his debut in 1989, he competed on the independent circuit for the next few years before debuting in the Global Wrestling Federation (GWF) in 1993 as Moadib. In 1995 he worked for NWA Dallas, feuding with John Hawk for the NWA North American Heavyweight Championship. He also toured Japan that year with Big Japan Pro Wrestling.

World Wrestling Federation

Debut (1995–1996)
Norris made his first appearance on July 15, 1995, wrestling on a house show in Houston, TX. Competing as Tony Norris he defeated Rico Suave. After being signed and given the ring name "Ahmed Johnson", he made his pre-television debut at In Your House 3 on September 24, 1995, in Saginaw, MI. Wrestling as a face, Johnson beat Skip in a non-televised match. His televised debut 
came on the October 23, 1995, episode of Raw. Prior to his first televised match, he appeared at the end of a Raw taping by entering a post-match brawl and slamming Yokozuna. He made his pay-per-view debut at Survivor Series, as the team of Razor Ramon, Yokozuna, Owen Hart, and Dean Douglas took on the team of Johnson, Shawn Michaels, Sid, and The British Bulldog. In the end, Johnson, Michaels, and Bulldog won the match as the survivors of their team, with Johnson eliminating both Owen Hart and Yokozuna by pinfall. At Season's Beatings on December 17, Johnson defeated Buddy Landel (who replaced Dean Douglas) in only 42 seconds.

After the match, Johnson was interviewed by Jerry Lawler, at which time Lawler distracted him in order for Jeff Jarrett to attack him, starting a feud between the two in the process. At the 1996 Royal Rumble, Johnson defeated Jarrett by disqualification after Jarrett struck him with a guitar (causing Johnson to be hospitalized for a concussion). At WrestleMania XII, Camp Cornette (Vader, Owen Hart, and The British Bulldog) took on the team of Johnson, Yokozuna, and Jake "The Snake" Roberts. Camp Cornette won when Vader pinned Roberts with the Vader Bomb. At Good Friends, Better Enemies on April 28, Roberts and Johnson teamed up to take on Hart and Bulldog. While Jim Cornette had the referee distracted, Bulldog hit him in the knee with Cornette's tennis racket; he then forced Roberts to submit with a single leg Boston crab. After the match, Roberts and Johnson attempted to put Roberts' python, Revelations, on Cornette, but Hart pulled Cornette out of the ring.

Intercontinental Champion (1996)
At King of the Ring, Johnson defeated Goldust to win the Intercontinental Championship. As the first African American Intercontinental Champion, most assumed it was only a matter of time before he climbed to main event status. He was soon paired on-screen with Shawn Michaels in several tag team matches and often helped Michaels against Jim Cornette and his men, known as Camp Cornette. At International Incident, Johnson, along with Sycho Sid and Michaels, lost to Vader, Owen Hart, and the British Bulldog.

On the July 22 edition of Raw, Michaels and Johnson teamed again and challenged The Smoking Gunns (Billy and Bart) for the Tag Team Championship. During the match, Faarooq Asad debuted and attacked Johnson. This was supposed to lead to a match at SummerSlam for the Intercontinental Title. On August 5 edition of Raw, Johnson won an 11-man battle royal, last eliminating the man whom he beat for the Intercontinental title, Goldust, to be the #1 contender for the WWF Championship for the day after SummerSlam. However, Johnson was diagnosed with legit kidney problems, and was forced to miss both SummerSlam and his scheduled WWF Championship match the following night.

As a result, he was out for four months and in order to keep the angle going, the attack by Faarooq was said to be the cause of the kidney damage. The news was made public on WWF programming by incorporating it into the 11-man battle royal which Johnson won. Voice-over commentary was added so that Johnson's participation in the battle royal was said to be against doctors' orders, when in reality his kidney problem had yet to be discovered at the time of taping. The injury forced him to vacate the Intercontinental Championship, which was subsequently won in a tournament by Marc Mero.

Feud with the Nation of Domination (1996–1998)

Johnson returned later in 1996 to enter a feud with Faarooq (who by then had a new gimmick and formed his own stable, the Nation of Domination). Finally, the two had an encounter at Royal Rumble 1997, where Johnson won by disqualification. Two days later, Johnson and The Undertaker defeated Faarooq and Nation member Crush in a No Holds Barred match at the Triple Threat event. He began teaming with Legion of Doom (Hawk and Animal) and the three fought the entire Nation at WrestleMania 13 in a Chicago Street Fight. At A Cold Day in Hell, he defeated Crush and Savio Vega in a gauntlet match before losing to Faarooq.

In June 1997, Johnson turned on WWF Champion The Undertaker and joined the New Nation, with Kama Mustafa, D'Lo Brown, and Faarooq. Johnson was injured soon after this; he was scheduled to face Undertaker at Canadian Stampede for the WWF Title, but was plagued by injuries and was replaced by Vader.

The Nation turned on him after he recovered and returned in August 1997, replacing him with Rocky Maivia, which resulted in Johnson turning face once more. He restarted his feud with the Nation, and would reunite with the Legion of Doom as well as join forces with Ken Shamrock during the feud. At Survivor Series 1997, they defeated the Nation in a Survivor Series match.

Departure from WWF
Johnson's last appearance was at the pay-per-view No Way Out of Texas in February 1998, alongside Shamrock and the Disciples of Apocalypse (Chainz, Skull, and 8-Ball) against the Nation.

While still in Texas, Johnson was booked to appear in a segment with The Truth Commission where he was to be beaten and dragged up the entrance ramp. Unbeknownst to WWF management, Johnson's sister - an avid fan of WWF - was battling cancer. Johnson knew his sister watched WWF each week and didn't want her to have the image of her brother being beaten and dragged by the neck while she was gravely ill. According to Johnson, 15 minutes before he was scheduled for the match which would end in his being attacked, he received a call that his sister was "doing really bad" and that he should come immediately to her hospital in Florida. Johnson then met with Vince McMahon and told him he "had some things to deal with" and immediately left WWF and flew to Florida, where his sister died the following week. Johnson has stated subsequently that he did not tell WWF management the reason for his departure at the time because he "didn't like to burden people with his problems" and didn't want to give the impression that he was "telling them something for sympathy". In a July 2021 interview, Johnson for the first time also made claims that racism was another reason for his departure saying, "There was a family issue that needed my attention, but, on top of that, there were other things going on behind scenes that didn’t sit right with me. I started noting a lot of racism going on. It called me not wanting to be there, and back off".

World Championship Wrestling (1999–2000)

In late 1999, Norris signed a contract with World Championship Wrestling (WCW) and debuted at Souled Out as a heel. He gained a massive amount of weight at this time, and was aptly named Big T. He interfered in a match between Harlem Heat tag team partners and real-life brothers, Booker T and Stevie Ray. He attacked Booker, causing Ray to be disqualified. Big T and Stevie formed the tag team Harlem Heat 2000. At SuperBrawl, he defeated Booker to earn the rights to the Harlem Heat name and the letter T. At Uncensored, he and Stevie lost to Booker and Billy Kidman. At Spring Stampede, they participated in a 5-team tag team tournament for the vacant World Tag Team Championship, where they lost to the eventual winners Shane Douglas and Buff Bagwell in the semi-finals of the tournament. He was released by WCW shortly afterwards due to ongoing weight issues.

Independent circuit and retirement (2002–2003)
Norris stayed away from wrestling after his release from WCW until he wrestled his return match for Arlington, Texas, based Professional Championship Wrestling in 2002 against Jared Steele. He wrestled his final match in 2003 in a tag team match for Maximum Pro Wrestling, teaming with Monty Brown in a losing effort against Sabu and Gangrel.

Since retiring, Norris began working for Booker T and Stevie Ray's Pro Wrestling Alliance wrestling school.

Personal life
Norris grew up in Florida before taking up residence in Houston, Texas, with his daughter Nina. He endured a harsh childhood, where his father abused his mother regularly and abused him as well if he intervened, he states.

According to Norris, he joined the United States Army but was later discharged due to striking his captain over viewing his orders as "kind of cowardly."

After retiring, he returned to college and earned a degree in criminology from Huston–Tillotson University.

In July 2016, Norris was named part of a class action lawsuit filed against WWE which alleged that wrestlers incurred traumatic brain injuries during their tenure and that the company concealed the risks of injury. The suit was litigated by attorney Konstantine Kyros, who has been involved in a number of other lawsuits against WWE. US District Judge Vanessa Lynne Bryant dismissed the lawsuit in September 2018.

Media
Ahmed Johnson was a playable character in the video games WWF In Your House and WWF War Zone.

Filmography
Witness to the Execution (1994) as Reggie Foster
Too Legit: The MC Hammer Story (2001) as Marion "Suge" Knight

Television appearances
Walker, Texas Ranger (1993) in episode "Unfinished Business" as Bruno

Championships and accomplishments 
Pro Wrestling Illustrated
PWI ranked him No. 5 of the top 500 singles wrestlers in the PWI 500 in 1996
PWI ranked him No. 380 of the 500 best singles wrestlers of the PWI Years in 2003
PWI Most Improved Wrestler of the Year (1996)
Texas All-Pro Wrestling
TAP Heavyweight Championship (1 time)
United States Wrestling Association
USWA Unified World Heavyweight Championship (1 time)
World Wrestling Federation
WWF Intercontinental Championship (1 time)
Kuwait Cup
Slammy Award (1 time)
New Sensation of the Squared Circle (1996)
Wrestling Observer Newsletter
Worst on Interviews (1996, 1997)

References

External links 

 

1963 births
20th-century African-American sportspeople
21st-century African-American people
African-American male professional wrestlers
American football linebackers
American male professional wrestlers
Dallas Cowboys players
Huston–Tillotson University alumni
Living people
Players of American football from Florida
People from Neshoba County, Mississippi
Professional wrestlers from Florida
Sportspeople from Polk County, Florida
Tennessee Volunteers football players
The Nation of Domination members
USWA Unified World Heavyweight Champions
WWF/WWE Intercontinental Champions
20th-century professional wrestlers
21st-century professional wrestlers